Marqui Christian (born October 27, 1994) is an American football safety who is a free agent. He played college football at Midwestern State. He was selected by the Arizona Cardinals in the fifth round of the 2016 NFL Draft and has also played for the Los Angeles Rams and New York Jets.

Early years
Christian attended Spring High School in Spring, Texas.

College career
Christian played college football at Midwestern State University from 2013 to 2016. He was named the Lone Star Conference's Top Male Athlete in 2016.

Professional career

Arizona Cardinals
The Arizona Cardinals drafted Christian in the fifth round with the 167th overall selection of the 2016 NFL Draft. On September 27, 2016, he was waived by the team.

Los Angeles Rams
On September 28, 2016, Christian was claimed off waivers by the Los Angeles Rams. He was placed on injured reserve on December 19, 2016 with an ankle injury.

On December 27, 2017, Christian was placed on injured reserve with a shoulder injury.

Chicago Bears
After his contract expired with the Rams in March 2020, Christian was suspended by the NFL for the first two weeks of the 2020 NFL season on June 18, 2020. He was signed by the Chicago Bears on August 12, 2020. After being reinstated from suspension, he was released and re-signed to the practice squad on September 21, 2020.

New York Jets
On September 23, 2020, Christian was signed by the New York Jets off the Bears practice squad. He was released on October 17; he played just one game for the Jets with no action on defense.

Chicago Bears (second stint)
Christian returned to the Bears' practice squad on October 23, 2020. He was elevated to the active roster on January 9, 2021, for the team's wild card playoff game against the New Orleans Saints, and reverted to the practice squad after the game. On January 11, 2021, Christian signed a reserve/futures contract with the Bears.

References

External links
 Los Angeles Rams bio
 Arizona Cardinals bio
 Midwestern State University profile

1994 births
Living people
American football safeties
People from Spring, Texas
Players of American football from Texas
Sportspeople from Harris County, Texas
Midwestern State Mustangs football players
Arizona Cardinals players
Los Angeles Rams players
Chicago Bears players
New York Jets players